In finance, correlation trading is a strategy in which the investor gets exposure to the average correlation of an index. 

The key to correlation trading is being able to predict when future realized correlation amongst the stocks of a particular index will be greater or less than the "implied" correlation level derived from derivatives on the index and its single stocks.  One observation related to correlation trading is the principle of diversification, which implies that the volatility of a portfolio of securities is less than (or equal to) the average volatility of all the securities in that portfolio (This has nothing to do with Modern Portfolio Theory and follows from Statistics 101, definition of portfolio variance). The lower the correlation amongst the individual securities, the lower the overall volatility of the entire portfolio. This is due to the way in which variances behave when summing correlated random variables.

To sell correlation, investors can:
 Sell a call option on the index and buy a portfolio of call options on the individual constituents of the index. Although typically in  practice, the trader would choose straddles instead of calls to minimize delta risk as its often not feasible to perfectly replicate the index with single stock options.;
 Sell a variance swap on the index and buy the variance swaps on the individual constituents; this particular kind of spread trade is called a variance dispersion trade.
 Sell a correlation swap.

In practice, exchange-traded funds (ETF's) are sometimes chosen instead of indices.

See also
Pairs trade
Rainbow option

Derivatives (finance)
Share trading